The 1973 Rothmans South of England Championships was men's tennis tournament played on outdoor grass courts at Devonshire Park Lawn Tennis Club in Eastbourne, England. The event was part of the Grand Prix circuit and was categorized as C class. It was the 79th and last edition of the tournament and was held from 18 June until 23 June 1973. Mark Cox  won the singles title, his third at the event after 1963 and 1968.

Finals

Singles
 Mark Cox defeated  Patrice Dominguez 6–2, 2–6, 6–3

Doubles
 Ove Bengtson /  Jim McManus defeated  Manuel Orantes /  Ion Ţiriac 6–4, 4–6, 7–5

References

External links
 ITF tournament edition details

Rothmans South of England Championships
Rothmans South of England Championships
Rothmans South of England Championships
Tennis tournaments in England